Obeah! is a 1935 American horror film directed by F. Herrick Herrick and starring Jean Brooks and Phillips Lord. In the United Kingdom, the film was released under the title The Mystery Ship. It is believed to be a lost film.

Plot
A sailor, known as "The Adventurer," searching for a lost American explorer discovers him being held hostage on a remote island in the South Sea. The man is held captive by the island's natives, who have placed him under a voodoo spell known as "obeah." The Adventurer attempts to halt a death ritual but fails, and the explorer dies. The Adventurer is forced to flee the island, taking with him a native woman and the daughter of the dead explorer.

With the help of a map taken from the explorer, the three attempt to locate a chest of gold that has been sunk off the island shore. Meanwhile, the high priest of the island people casts a curse on the three, and a love triangle ensues between those on the ship.

Cast
Jean Brooks
Phillips H. Lord as the Adventurer
Alice Wessler
Alexander McCatty

Production
The film was produced by the New York City-based production company Arcturus Pictures. Based on a story by director F. Herrick Herrick, the film's script was written by Robert Carse, the film's production began in June 1934 and lasted several weeks. The film was shot on location in Kingston, Jamaica.

An additional article published in Film Daily claimed the film's shoot lasted a total of eleven months, shot on a worldwide cruise that stopped in over twenty countries. Later trade reports reported the shoot had only lasted four months. The ship's crew as well as various unknown performers appear in the film. Scenes were filmed at Papine and Port Royal, alongside interior shots in downtown Kingston bars.

See also
List of lost films

Notes

References

Works cited

External links

1935 films
American supernatural horror films
Films set in the Caribbean
Films set on ships
Films shot in Jamaica
Lost American films
Films about witchcraft
Lost horror films
American black-and-white films
1935 horror films
1935 lost films
1930s American films